Bisexuality better known as bisexual, in human sexuality, describes a person that is sexually attracted to persons of both the same sex and persons of the opposite sex.

Bisexual may also refer to:
Bisexual characteristics, having an ambiguous sexual identity (e.g. epicenity or androgyny)
A bisexual flower (monoicy), in botany, one that possesses both male (pollen-producing) and female (seed-producing) parts
A bisexual plant (monoecy), in botany, having separate male and female cones or flowers on the same plant
Dioecy, in biology, a species that has members of two different distinct sexes (e.g. humans), opposed to unisexual (only one sex present, always females)
The Bisexual, a 2018 British-American comedy-drama television series

See also
By-Sexual, a Japanese visual kei punk rock band from Osaka